Ismail Shammout (1930 – 2006) was a Palestinian artist and art historian.

Biography
Shammout was born in 1930 in Lydda. On July 12, 1948, he and his family were amongst 25,000 residents of Lydda expelled from their homes by Israeli occupation. The Shammout family moved to the Gaza refugee camp of Khan-Younes. In 1950 Shammout went to Cairo and enrolled in the College of Fine Arts. After returning to Gaza in 1953, he held his first exhibition, which was a success.

Shammout and Palestinian artist Tamam al Akhal participated in the Palestine Exhibition of 1954 in Cairo. The exhibition was inaugurated by then Egyptian President Gamal Abdul Nasser. Later in 1954, he moved to Italy and enrolled at the Academia De Belle Arti in Rome. He married al Akhal in 1959. Their work has been exhibited in several countries.

Shammout became a part of the Palestine Liberation Organization (PLO) as the Director of Arts and National Culture in 1965. He also held the position of Secretary General of the Union of Palestinian Artists. He became Secretary General of the Union of Arab artists in 1969. In 1992 he and his wife, al Akhal, moved to Germany due to the Gulf War. After Germany, they settled in Jordan.

He and Al Akhal, returned to Lydda in 1997.

He died on July 1, 2006 at the age of seventy-six.

Artistic work
Shammout was an influential Palestinian artist, whose prominent style of painting employs recognizable symbols of Palestinian culture and traditions.

Shammout's Where to ..? (1953), an oil painting on canvas, is a painting depicting the Lydda Death March in July 1948. This painting has attained iconic status in Palestinian culture. It is perhaps the best-known version of his several representations of the refugee experience of the Palestinians. In the foreground, it depicts a life-size image of an elderly man dressed in rags carrying a walking stick in his left hand while his right hand grasps the wrist of a crying child. A sleeping toddler on his shoulder is resting his cheek upon the old man's head. Just behind them is a third child crying and walking alone. In the background there is a skyline of an Arab town with a minaret, while in the middle ground there is a withered tree.

From 1997 to 2000, he and al Akhal painted a collection of 19 large murals called Palestine: The Exodus and the Odyssey. The paintings illustrate, in chronological sequence, the plight of the Palestinians since 1948.

See also
 Palestinian art
 Art of the Arab–Israeli conflict

References

Bibliography

External links
, by Mary Joury, 2003,
Halaby, Samia: "In Remembrance: Ismail Shammout"

1930 births
2006 deaths
Palestinian painters
Palestinian artists
20th-century painters